Aimé Terme (born ) is a weightlifter, who competed in the 75 kg category and represented France at international competitions. He participated at the 1972 Summer Olympics in the 75 kg event.

References

External links
 

1945 births
Living people
French male weightlifters
Olympic weightlifters of France
Weightlifters at the 1972 Summer Olympics